The 1927–28 season was the 54th season of competitive football by Rangers.

Overview

Results
All results are written with Rangers' score first.

Scottish League Division One

Scottish Cup

Appearances

See also
 1927–28 in Scottish football
 1927–28 Scottish Cup

References

Scottish football championship-winning seasons
Rangers F.C. seasons
Rangers